Canucha miranda is a moth in the family Drepanidae. It was described by Warren in 1923. It is found in north-eastern India, China and Taiwan.

The wingspan is 52–61 mm. Adults have been recorded on wing in August.

References

Moths described in 1923
Drepaninae